Colombia competed at the Summer Deaflympics for the first time in 1969. Colombia also won its only Deaflympics medal to date that same year. Colombia has never participated in the Winter Deaflympics.

Medal tallies

Summer Deaflympics

Medals at each sports events

See also 
Colombia at the Paralympics
Colombia at the Olympics

References

External links 
2017 Deaflympics

Nations at the Deaflympics
Parasports in Colombia
Colombia at multi-sport events
Deaf culture in Colombia